James "Dirty" Davis (born April 26, 1979) is a former linebacker in the National Football League. He attended West Virginia University, where he also played defensive end. He earned All-Big East Conference second-team honors in 2002. He was drafted in the 2003 NFL Draft by the Detroit Lions in the fifth round. He has 4 kids and is also engaged.

Collegiate career
Switching from defensive back, linebacker, and end in his four-year collegiate career at West Virginia University, James "Dirty" Davis became one of the better players in school history. The All-Big East second-team honoree in 2002 began his career in 1999 with 18 tackles and a forced fumble. The next season, 2000, Davis recorded 49 tackles, 12 tackles for a loss, and 6 sacks. In his junior season, 2001, Davis totaled 51 tackles, one forced fumble, two fumble recoveries, 14 tackles for a loss, and 8 sacks. In his senior season, 2002, Davis finished his career with a career-high 120 tackles, two forced fumbles, 13.5 tackles for a loss, and four sacks.

Professional career

Detroit Lions
James Davis was drafted by the Detroit Lions in the 2003 NFL Draft. The fifth round selection played in eight games on the season, recording 8 tackles and two pass break-ups.

In his sophomore season in the league, 2004, Davis played in all 16 games. He set career-highs with 83 tackles, 3.5 sacks, and three pass break-ups. The next season, 2005, Davis only recorded 59 tackles in all sixteen games of the season.

New York Giants
In 2006, James Davis was signed by the New York Giants. He did not see any action during the season however, and was released at the beginning of the 2007 season. He now works as a coach for a local football team.

References

1979 births
Living people
American football linebackers
Detroit Lions players
New York Giants players
People from Stuart, Florida
Players of American football from Florida
West Virginia Mountaineers football players